Bradley Aaron Keselowski (born February 12, 1984) is an American professional stock car racing driver, team owner, and entrepreneur. He competes full-time in the NASCAR Cup Series, driving the No. 6 Ford Mustang for RFK Racing, a team he also co-owns. He was the owner of Brad Keselowski Racing, which fielded two full-time trucks in the NASCAR Camping World Truck Series.

Keselowski, who began his NASCAR career in 2004, is the second of only six drivers who have won a championship in both the Cup Series and the Xfinity Series, and the twenty-fifth driver to win a race in each of NASCAR's three national series.

He is the owner and founder of Keselowski Advanced Manufacturing, a hybrid manufacturing company based in Statesville, North Carolina, specializing in additive metal technologies as well as CNC machining.

Early life and career
Keselowski was born in Rochester Hills, Michigan, and grew up in a racing family. He is the fifth child of Kay and Bob Keselowski and the nephew of Ron Keselowski. His older brother, Brian, is also an active racing driver. The Keselowski family is of Polish descent.

Keselowski spent much of his adolescence working at his father's race shop; he swept and mopped the floors, and mowed the grass. In 2000, Keselowski began racing stock cars in the Factory Stock division.

NASCAR

2004–06: Early years
In 2004, at only 20 years old, Keselowski began his NASCAR career as the driver of the No. 29 Ford F-150 for the generally owned company in the Craftsman Truck Series. He made his debut in the Kroger 250 at Martinsville, where he started twenty-sixth and finished thirty-third. He made seven more starts that season, with his best finish coming in the UAW/GM Ohio 250 at Mansfield, where he finished 16th.

Keselowski began competing in the Truck Series full-time in 2005 with backing from SUBcrews.com and Samson Stone. He opened the season with a seventh-place finish in the Florida Dodge Dealers 250 at Daytona, his only top ten finish of the year. He would end up finishing twenty-first in points. He ran the first two races of 2006 for K-Automotive before a lack of sponsorship caused the team to temporarily suspend operations. Keselowski then drove the No. 02 Chevrolet at Kentucky and Memphis, filling in for an injured Kelly Sutton, and drove the No. 63 Ford for MB Motorsports at Bristol and in the season finale, the Ford 200 at Homestead.

2007–09: Breakout years

Keselowski began competing in the Busch Series full-time in 2007. He drove the No. 23 Chevrolet Monte Carlo SS for Keith Coleman Racing until the team suspended operations in July. Earlier in June, during the 2007 Truck Series season, Keselowski was tabbed by Germain Racing to replace Ted Musgrave in the No. 9 Team ASE Toyota Tundra for the O'Reilly 200 at Memphis after Musgrave was suspended for an in-race scuffle with another driver at the Milwaukee Mile. Keselowski won his first career pole for the race, and led sixty-two laps, but got turned around by Travis Kvapil as they fought for the lead with ten laps to go. Keselowski wound up finishing 16th. Shortly afterward, Keselowski was called by car owner Dale Earnhardt Jr. to drive the No. 88 United States Navy-sponsored Chevrolet for JR Motorsports for three races, and eventually the rest of the Busch Series season. During the Camping World 300 at California Speedway, Keselowski was involved in an accident involving A. J. Allmendinger and J. J. Yeley. Keselowski was able to climb out of his damaged car but complained of foot pain. He would later be treated and released from Loma Linda University Medical Center and was cleared to race at Richmond the following weekend. Keselowski would close the 2007 season out with five top-ten finishes and a twenty-fifth-place finish in points.

In 2008 Keselowski re-signed with JR Motorsports for the 2008 Nationwide Series season, and earned his first career victory in the Federated Auto Parts 300 at Nashville Superspeedway, holding off Clint Bowyer. Keselowski would hold off Bowyer again for his second career win in the Food City 250 at Bristol Motor Speedway. He ended the season third in points, the highest finish by a full-time Nationwide Series-only driver. Keselowski also got his first taste of Sprint Cup action during the 2008 season. He was on standby for an ill Jeff Gordon at Kansas and for expectant father Casey Mears at Talladega, before competing in two races for Hendrick Motorsports in the No. 25 GoDaddy.com Chevrolet Impala. Keselowski finished 19th in his Cup debut, the Dickies 500 at Texas, and 23rd in the Ford 400 at Homestead.

Keselowski returned to JR Motorsports to drive the No. 88 Chevrolet for the 2009 Nationwide Series, with sponsorship from GoDaddy.com, as well as competing in a limited Cup schedule. He drove the No. 25 GoDaddy.com Chevrolet for Hendrick Motorsports in seven races and drove the No. 09 Miccosukee-sponsored Chevrolet for Phoenix Racing in five races.

First career Sprint Cup victory at Talladega
Keselowski pulled off a massive upset and earned his first career Sprint Cup victory in the Aaron's 499 at Talladega. He pushed Carl Edwards towards the front from fifth with two laps to go. Coming out of turn four on the final lap, he attempted to trick Edwards into blocking on the high side so that he could pull underneath. Edwards moved high to block, opening the door for Keselowski to attempt a pass on the low side. When he saw Keselowski moving low, Edwards again tried to block him. Their cars made contact, with Edwards spinning as Keselowski charged to the checkered flag. Due to the rear-wing design on 2009 Car of Tomorrow, Edwards' car lifted off of the ground as it spun backward. After Ryan Newman's No. 39 hit Edwards' car, it sailed into the catch fence separating the track from the front grandstands, then skidded to a halt in the middle of the track. Eight fans were injured by flying debris; the most serious one being a woman who broke her jaw and was taken by helicopter to a nearby hospital. Keselowski earned his first career victory on his fifth career start and earned James Finch his first career victory as an owner in his twentieth year of racing. The race's final lap was the first Sprint Cup lap that Keselowski ever led, and therefore the only lap he led for the entire race; this was the first time in history that the very first lap a Sprint Cup driver led was the final lap of a race.

Rest of the 2009 season

Keselowski's victory at Talladega earned him more seat time in the James Finch-owned Chevy. Originally scheduled to appear next in the 18th race of the season, at Daytona International Speedway, he was then rescheduled to appear in the upcoming race at Richmond International Raceway. Keselowski also was entered into the Sprint All-Star Race as well. He was forced to pull out of the Richmond race due to commitments to his Nationwide Series team.

Keselowski got his third Nationwide Series victory at Dover when Kyle Busch cut a tire on the restart and second-place Joey Logano made contact, allowing Keselowski to pass both.

After taking a gamble and staying out past his pit window, Keselowski garnered his fourth win at the first-ever Nationwide race at Iowa Speedway after battling Kyle Busch to take over and maintain the first position. Keselowski finished first over Kyle Busch, though Busch still tied a record with his ninth consecutive top-two finish.

At Montreal in the 2009 NAPA 200, Keselowski had a promising run. After a brief red flag for sprinkles, Keselowski only could hold his spot up in the top fifteen causing him to lose some spots in the standings. With three laps left, Keselowski barely avoided a pile-up in turn 1 to end up in the fifth spot earning back his lost points. When the race ended with rival Carl Edwards as the winner, Keselowski among other drivers said that the pile-up and the shocking finish between Marcos Ambrose and Carl Edwards; resembled the finish of the Montreal race in 2007 when Marcos Ambrose almost won but was crashed by Robby Gordon during the confusion of a similar crash in turn 1.

Keselowski's next Nationwide Series victory came in August at the CARFAX 250 at Michigan International Speedway. Pole-sitter Brian Vickers and points-leader Kyle Busch dominated the race, but Keselowski passed them both on the final lap after a blocking move by Vickers on Busch forced both drivers to slow down slightly.

The rest of Keselowski's 2009 season in Sprint Cup was less than stellar. After the win, he only captured two top fifteen finishes until November 2009. He met controversy at the fall race in Talladega when he bumped future teammate Kurt Busch going into the tri-oval causing a fifteen-car melee, that included Busch, Jeff Gordon, and Mark Martin - who went upside down after being clipped by Martin Truex Jr. Because Keselowski was already being ridiculed by most of the drivers and fans for how he drove aggressively throughout the races, this wreck earned him some jeers, including a disapproving look from Mark Martin.

In the Nationwide Series, Keselowski also had a series of run-ins with Denny Hamlin. Throughout 2007, 2008, and 2009, Keselowski and Hamlin tangled in many races. After Keselowski punted Hamlin during the autumn Phoenix event in the Nationwide race, Hamlin said he would retaliate. The next week Hamlin kept his promise, intentionally colliding into Keselowski early in the race. The wreck ended Keselowski's huge chances of beating Kyle Busch for the championship. NASCAR black-flagged Hamlin 3 laps for aggressive rough driving, but Hamlin recovered for a top ten spot. Hamlin was unapologetic in an interview and while Keselowski also remained unrepentant, saying "I've already moved on," Keselowski got little or no sympathy from most of his fellow competitors.

Keselowski ended up in third spot behind rivals Carl Edwards and Kyle Busch in the final NNS standings.

2010–2021: Penske years

Although Keselowski had rubbed some of his fellow drivers the wrong way with his driving style, the results he produced on the track seemed to indicate that a permanent move to the Sprint Cup Series was an inevitability. Despite his relationship with Dale Earnhardt Jr. and Hendrick Motorsports, the team did not have a car for him to drive full-time as each of their four regular teams had established drivers under contract. Keselowski began looking elsewhere and left the Chevrolet camp to drive a Dodge for Team Penske.

2010

In 2010, Keselowski replaced David Stremme in the No. 12  Dodge Charger in the Cup Series and ran the full Nationwide Series schedule as well in the No. 22 Discount Tire. In Atlanta, on lap 41, Keselowski unintentionally tapped Carl Edwards on a restart and Edwards went up to the wall to collect Joey Logano. Later, Keselowski appeared to be headed toward a top-5 finish at Atlanta with three laps to go when Edwards, apparently in retaliation for this accident, intentionally spun Keselowski. Keselowski's car caught air and despite the roof flaps working his car overturned, hitting the front-stretch wall roof-first in an accident that resembled the Talladega finish of the previous year. His new teammate Kurt Busch ended up winning the race. Edwards was parked by NASCAR and Keselowski was physically okay, but shaken up from the heavy impact.

Keselowski scored his first 2010 Nationwide win at Talladega on April 25, after crashing out of the Sprint Cup race earlier in the day, and then went on to win five more races at Richmond, Nashville, Michigan, and Charlotte. At Gateway International Raceway in 2010 Brad Keselowski fought rival Carl Edwards again in the closing stages of the Nationwide Race. On the final lap, Keselowski got loose and unintentionally bumped Edwards. Keselowski briefly took the lead, but gave the position back and fell in behind Edwards. The two ran side by side through turns two and three before Edwards ran high in turn 4 and then made a hard left into the right quarter panel of the No. 22, tuning him intentionally into the wall hard at the finish line and causing an 11 car wreck. Keselowski's car came down in front of the field and was hit hard by the car of Shelby Howard.  Keselowski climbed out of his car with a grimace on his face and mostly unscathed, though one driver was sent to the hospital with rib injuries. With his team and in victory lane Edwards was loudly booed as he bragged publicly that the crash was not an accident. Keselowski was infuriated and told a reporter that Edwards just wrecked him for no reason, saying, "I am sure Edwards will say sorry or think about how cool he is in his mind but that is not reality." That week NASCAR put Edwards on probation for his actions, fined him $25,000, and deducted 60 points from him in the Nationwide Series point standings. NASCAR also placed Keselowski on probation just in case Keselowski felt the need to pay Edwards back. Both drivers were then told by NASCAR to either calm down the rivalry or face an indefinite suspension from the sport.

At Bristol in the Nationwide Series race Keselowski was the center of controversy because he was involved in an accident caused by Kyle Busch. In turn 3 with 33 laps left, Busch slid in front of Keselowski, causing Keselowski to bump him. Busch was angry that Keselowski bumped him, so in the next turn, Busch retaliated, by intentionally wrecking Keselowski into the wall. NASCAR did not penalize Busch because they had previously made a rule allowing drivers to police themselves called "Boys have at it." Keselowski finished in 14th instead of possibly contending for the race win. Kyle Busch ended up winning the race and admitted that wrecking Brad was on purpose in a post-race conference. In reply to the crash, Keselowski called Busch "an ass" during driver introductions before the Cup race. Both drivers were given a warning by NASCAR the next week and temporary placed on probation. In 2012, Keselowski and Kyle Busch announced that they ended their rivalry though they've had a few run-ins since (Such as when Keselowski and Busch made contact at Watkins Glen in 2012 and Busch crashing Keselowski at Kansas in 2013) that didn't boil over.

The next week at Montreal, Keselowski redeemed himself from Bristol. Keselowski had his greatest finish at the track in 4th spot. He was in the 6th spot on the restart but Robby Gordon ran out of gas on the restart letting Keselowski battle Paul Menard for 4th place. Eventually, as Boris Said and Max Papis had a close amazing finish for the win, Keselowski had a similar finish with Paul Menard with Keselowski holding off Menard for 4th spot.

With crew chief Paul Wolfe all year, Keselowski won his first ever NASCAR Nationwide Series title, collecting 6 wins, five poles, 26 top 5s, and 29 top 10s along the way. His 26 top 5s beat Kyle Busch's record of 25 top 5s set in 2009.

In the Sprint Cup, it was a different story. Keselowski finished 25th in the final Sprint Cup standings and recorded one pole, no wins, 0 top 5s, and 2 top 10s.

2011

For 2011, Keselowski moved over to Penske's long-time flagship car, the No. 2 Miller Lite-sponsored Dodge. The switch with Kurt Busch, who had driven the car since 2006, occurred due to a sponsorship change and consolidation of operations at the team. Royal Dutch Shell, who had most recently sponsored Kevin Harvick's No. 29 Chevrolet for Richard Childress Racing, signed on to sponsor Penske's second car, which Keselowski had been driving. At the insistence of Shell, the more experienced Busch was moved to the renumbered No. 22 Dodge and his crew went with him. Keselowski, meanwhile, had his crew follow him to the No. 2 and the team's third unit, the No. 77 which had been driven by Sam Hornish Jr., was dissolved (its sponsor, Mobil 1, had left the team) and its operations merged with Keselowski's team.

Keselowski's Nationwide Series crew chief Paul Wolfe replaced Jay Guy in the Sprint Cup Series; Todd Gordon became Keselowski's crew chief in the NASCAR Nationwide Series.

Keselowski's 2011 Cup season began slowly, but starting in May his fortunes began to change. He won the pole for the 2011 Coca-Cola 600, and the following week, he was able to get the lead with nine laps to go and hold off a charging Dale Earnhardt Jr. to win the 2011 STP 400 at Kansas Speedway on fuel mileage. During his victory celebration, he ran out of fuel.

While testing at Road Atlanta in August, Keselowski was driving over 200 miles per hour on a straightaway, but his brakes unexpectedly failed. Keselowski could not stop and slammed into a solid concrete wall violently at approximately 190 MPH and broke his left ankle. Keselowski was airlifted to a hospital, claiming he had terrible back pain. Despite racing with injuries, Keselowski won his second race of the season at the Good Sam RV Insurance 500 at Pocono Raceway less than a week after the accident. The win put him into contention to grab one of the two "Wild Card" spots available in the Chase for the Sprint Cup championship.

The next week, Keselowski finished second at the 2011 Heluva Good! Sour Cream Dips at The Glen. He took the lead on a restart two laps to go but was passed by Marcos Ambrose in turn five of the same lap. A violent crash involving David Reutimann and David Ragan on the last lap forced NASCAR to throw the caution, and Ambrose was declared the winner. Keselowski followed his 2nd-place finish with a 3rd-place finish at the Pure Michigan 400. The next week, Keselowski won his third race of the year at the Irwin Tools Night Race at Bristol.

That win virtually assured Keselowski a spot in the 2011 Chase for the Cup, given NASCAR's rule change designating the final two Chase spots as wild card slots for drivers ranked 11th through 20th in the points with the most wins. Keselowski finished the regular season 11th in points, using his three wins to qualify for his first career Chase.

Keselowski was a factor for much of the Chase, before a late spin during the Tums Fast Relief 500 at Martinsville Speedway derailed his championship hopes. Still, Keselowski finished his second full Cup season fifth in the point standings, 84 points behind champion Tony Stewart. Keselowski finished the season with more wins than teammate Busch (three to two) and with better points finish.

2012: Championship year

In addition to continuing running in the Sprint Cup Series and a limited Nationwide Series schedule for Penske Racing, Keselowski has competed in a limited number of Camping World Truck Series races for his own team as a teammate to Parker Kligerman.

Statistically, 2012 was Keselowski's best Sprint Cup season to date: he won five races on the way to winning his first Sprint Cup championship. Keselowski started the year by memorably posting pictures and status updates via Twitter from his car during a red flag period. Cars were stopped on the track when a mechanical failure on Juan Pablo Montoya's car caused it to run into a jet dryer under caution at the Daytona 500, leading to a large fire that damaged the track surface, which had to be repaired before the race could be concluded. Keselowski was caught up in a crash on lap 188 and finished 32nd.

On March 18 he won his first race of the season, the Food City 500 at Bristol. He also won the Aaron's 499 at Talladega from a late-race restart and a push from Kyle Busch that allowed him to overtake Matt Kenseth. It was the first time since Dave Marcis in 1976 that Dodge won a Sprint Cup Series race at Talladega and only the fourth win at the track for the automaker. (This also proved to be Dodge's last win at the track as the manufacturer left NASCAR following the end of the 2012 season.)

On June 30, Keselowski picked up his 3rd win at Kentucky Speedway, the first driver to win three races in the 2012 Cup season and joining Kyle Busch as the first two-time Sprint Cup winners of the race at Kentucky. Beginning with Kentucky, Keselowski went on a hot streak that lasted to the season finale at Homestead that ultimately earned him his Sprint Cup title. In these 19 races, he only finished worse than 11th twice (30th at Bristol and 15th at Homestead).

Keselowski won the first Nationwide series race to be contested at the Indianapolis Motor Speedway, the Indiana 250.  Although Penske Racing has fifteen victories in the Indianapolis 500, this was the team's first NASCAR triumph at the track.

In August 2012, Keselowski put himself in second place at the Nationwide race at Watkins Glen. He led the closing stages but several cautions ended up putting his old rival Carl Edwards to the lead; with two laps to go Keselowski fell back to second place and Edwards charged for the win and in victory lane, he confirmed he and Keselowski no longer dislike each other; Keselowski in his review said the same confirmation.

The next day, Keselowski led 37 laps in the Finger Lakes 355 at Watkins Glen. With two laps to go, he was second behind Kyle Busch, and had Marcos Ambrose behind him. Busch slipped on oil after taking the white flag, and Keselowski slid into him, spinning him out in the esses. Keselowski then led most of the final lap before Ambrose was able to get by Keselowski in the final turns; Keselowski finished second to Ambrose in an almost carbon-copy repeat of the previous year's finish.

Keselowski notched another 2nd-place finish the following week at Michigan, leading with 10 laps to go but being passed by Jimmie Johnson and Greg Biffle. Johnson's engine blew up leading with six laps to go, giving the race to Biffle. Keselowski's strong showing during the 2012 Sprint Cup season qualified him automatically for the Chase for the Sprint Cup, which he entered in 4th place on account of his 3 regular-season wins.

In September, he won the first race in the Chase, the GEICO 400 at Chicagoland Speedway. Two weeks after that, he won at Dover after several of the dominant leaders had to pit late for fuel, allowing him to assume the point lead. Keselowski continued on a hot streak of top-eleven finishes: 7th at Talladega, 11th at Charlotte, and 7th at Kansas, although his point lead over Jimmie Johnson narrowed during this stretch. He lost the point lead to Johnson the following week at Martinsville, finishing sixth while Johnson won. The next week Keselowski finished second at Texas, racing Johnson hard before relinquishing the lead. His aggressive driving at the end of the race prompted defending champion Tony Stewart to say that Keselowski drove with a 'death wish.'

While Johnson wrecked the following week in Phoenix, Keselowski's sixth-place finish allowed him to reassume the points lead by 20 points. During a red flag period due to Jeff Gordon intentionally crashing Clint Bowyer, Keselowski again tweeted a photo from his car. NASCAR fined Keselowski $25,000 for this, stating that it was prohibited under NASCAR rules (despite NASCAR not having penalized Keselowski for tweeting a photo from his car during the lengthy red flag at the Daytona 500). He qualified third for the finale at Homestead-Miami, but was then moved up to second after pole-sitter Joey Logano was involved in a Saturday practice wreck involving Greg Biffle and Denny Hamlin. Keselowski finished in 15th place, but still clinched his first Sprint Cup championship when Johnson dropped out of the race with gear failure, joining Jeff Gordon and Dale Earnhardt as the only drivers to win the Cup championship within their first three full-time seasons.  In an interview on ESPN's SportsCenter during the post-race celebration, Keselowski admitted to being "a little buzzed" after consuming plenty of his sponsor, Miller Lite. The video of his interview went viral; interviewer Kevin Connors called it the best interview in SportsCenter's history.

2013: Championship Hangover

Keselowski opened the 2013 season with four straight top-5 finishes, including a fourth-place finish in the Daytona 500 despite being caught up in two crashes. He almost was on point to repeat what Dale Earnhardt had accomplished in 1995 – start off the season following his championship with five top five finishes, but this attempt came to an end at the Auto Club 500, where he finished 24th after dealing with handling issues. He posted three more top-10s in the next three races before suffering a dropped cylinder in his engine towards the end of the Toyota Owners 400 at Richmond International Raceway that relegated him to a 33rd-place finish. From April–May 2013, Keselowski had one of his worst spring starts of a NASCAR season.

At Talladega, Keselowski had a promising run. After a long red flag due to rain Keselowski was entering the top ten. He drove his way up to contention to win after two crashes. On the last restart, Keselowski started on the low line. Because of a misunderstanding, Keselowski was not happy with the race winner David Ragan after he ended up in the 15th spot due to him being told to restart on the not preferred low line. David Ragan lined up on the high side after making a pass on Keselowski under caution. Ragan used the lane and went on to win a race that is considered the biggest upset of 2013.

After climbing out of his car, Keselowski gave a rant on Twitter accusing David Ragan of lining up improperly and NASCAR allowing a rule violation. Nobody agreed with him and Keselowski got jeered by fans and media; which further made Keselowski frustrated. However, after looking at a video of the finish Keselowski realized that NASCAR was directing fairly and that Ragan was fairly in his line; he apologized two days later.

At Darlington, Keselowski finished in 32nd place after being involved in a crash on lap 313. At Charlotte in the All-Star race, Keselowski had one of his most heartbreaking races ever. On lap 2, he lost a transmission. He had to slide 15,000 feet back around the track to get to the garage. His car had broken down from steering problems that would take the rest of the race to fix. Keselowski also attended the Indianapolis 500 to cheer on and direct his Team Penske friend/teammate, Helio Castroneves. At the Coca-Cola 600 at Charlotte, though, on lap 317, Keselowski was wrecked by Danica Patrick after her off-track boyfriend Ricky Stenhouse made it three-wide. Keselowski subsequently retired from the race, finishing 35th, his first DNF since the 2012 Daytona 500. At Kentucky, Keselowski won the rain-shortened Nationwide race, but in the Sprint Cup race, he was tagged on lap 47 by Kurt Busch, causing a seven-car wreck, and he finished 34th. He then had a 21st-place finish at Daytona in the Coke Zero 400.

At New Hampshire, Keselowski won his first pole of the season.  On August 10, 2013, Keselowski won at Watkins Glen in the Nationwide series, giving him 4 consecutive wins in his last 4 starts.

At Watkins Glen International in the Cup race, Keselowski recovered from a spin in turn 1 to challenge former Cup rival Kyle Busch for the victory. Keselowski was unable to get by Kyle and finished in second place for the third consecutive time in the event (2011, 2012, and 2013). Brad raced Kyle completely clean, later saying he did it in an attempt to repair their old rivalry. After the event at Watkins Glen International, Keselowski said "I had nothing for Kyle. He had a great run. Congrats to him and those guys. I could not get by him unless I wrecked him in that final turn and I didn't want to create drama so I decided to settle for my second-place spot."

At Michigan, Keselowski nearly scored his first dream Cup victory while in a fuel crisis. Keselowski led with 30 laps left but caution issues forced him to pit, putting him in the 12th spot for the final results. The only positive side of Keselowski's heartbreak was that through his new teammate Joey Logano who won the race; Penske Racing won at the track they originated from. After the race, Keselowski emotionally said that although he was sad about losing, he was happy to have seen his entire team win the race through Logano.  On September 5, 2013, Keselowski won the 3rd Nationwide Series race at Richmond, making it 5 race wins in his last 6 starts, and his 24th career win in the series.  However, he was in danger of being the second defending Sprint Cup champion since Tony Stewart to ever miss the Chase in the next season.

At Richmond, Keselowski led the most laps with 142, but a late caution during the race caused him to finish 17th, and missed the Chase due to being 16th in the points standings. On October 2, Keselowski signed a contract extension with Penske Racing to remain with the team until 2017.

At Charlotte, Keselowski started well, though he was penalized early when he left his pit during a pit stop under caution carrying the jack with him. He rallied to the last caution and took the last restart in 4th. After battling Kasey Kahne for the lead with 15 laps remaining, Keselowski took the point and captured the win. This was Keselowski's first win driving a Ford, snapping a 38 race winless streak, and also the first Chase race won by a "spoiler" (non-Chaser) since Kahne won at Phoenix in November 2011.

NRA 500 controversy
His car and teammate Joey Logano's car each failed pre-race inspections at the NRA 500 at Texas Motor Speedway due to an issue with the cars' rear-end housings.  Keselowski was able to start the race from his original qualifying position as his car cleared inspection as driver introductions were ending, while Logano was forced to start from the back of the field because he didn't pass inspection in time to line up in the starting grid.  After the race, Keselowski told members of the news media that he felt the Penske teams had been targeted by NASCAR.  Both drivers finished the race in the top 10, with Keselowski finishing 9th.

On Wednesday, April 17, 2013, NASCAR announced penalties related to the rear-housing infraction discovered in Keselowski and Logano's cars before the NRA 500:  Keselowski's crew chief Paul Wolfe, car chief Jerry Kelley, team engineer Brian Wilson, and Penske competition director Travis Geisler were all suspended for the next six races, including the non-points Sprint All-star Race.  Wolfe was also fined $100,000 and Keselowski was docked 25 driver points. Identical penalties were also handed down to all of the people in the same positions on Logano's team. Penske Racing released a statement saying the organization planned to appeal the penalties, but on May 1, the NASCAR Appeals Panel unanimously upheld the penalties. Team owner Roger Penske said he would further appeal the ruling to NASCAR Chief Appellate Officer John Middlebrook.

2014: Redemption

Keselowski started his 2014 season finishing second to Denny Hamlin in the Sprint Unlimited.

In the Budweiser Duel, Keselowski led 34 laps early, until the cycle of green-flag pit stops. However, he was caught speeding and ended up finishing dead last, three laps down. He still made the Daytona 500 under an owner's points provisional. In the Daytona 500, Keselowski started 33rd, led 13 laps, and finished 3rd.

He was the first driver to win a pole position under the two-round version of the new "knockout" qualifying procedure. Keselowski led three laps and finished 3rd.

At Las Vegas, Keselowski and Joey Logano swept the front row again, with Logano winning the pole. He led 53 laps and overtook Dale Earnhardt Jr. for the lead on the last lap after Earnhardt Jr. ran out of fuel to score his first win of the season. Keselowski was very emotional about his win because it automatically qualified him in the Chase; redemption from 2013 when he did not make the Chase.

At Martinsville a few weeks later Keselowski got into a feud with former Penske teammate Kurt Busch. On pit road, Keselowski stopped for a stalled Kasey Kahne. Kurt didn't react in time and rammed Brad from behind. Keselowski replied by giving Busch a hand gesture on the track at lap 87. Kurt Busch threatened to "(expletive) Brad's face up." Kurt calmed down and went on to win the race. This incident remains a topic of debate.

Keselowski nearly won the Toyota Owners 400 a few weeks later, but engaged in a battle with Matt Kenseth and Jeff Gordon which allowed teammate Joey Logano to take the lead and ultimately the win with 4 laps left. Kenseth had repeatedly blocked Keselowski, trying to keep him from winning the race. Keselowski showed displeasure with Kenseth after the race, pointing his finger at him and throwing his gloves into his car. Keselowski called Kenseth's blocking "Mind-boggling". However, though Keselowski was upset with Kenseth, he jumped onto the hood of Logano's car and gave him a thumbs up. Keselowski and Logano are great friends off and on track.

A week later at Talladega, Keselowski tried to go for the lead on lap 13, but when the leader, Danica Patrick, tried to slide behind Keselowski, she got into his left-rear quarter panel and wrecked him. Later in the race, Keselowski was trying to regain his final lap back but got loose and spun. 14 cars wrecked as they attempted to avoid Keselowski's spin. During the controversy over his spin, Keselowski said in an interview that it was not on purpose and apologized on television and in a tweet on Twitter. The victims of the wreck, fellow racers, and many fans were upset with Keselowski for his actions as it appeared that Keselowski was setting a double standard following his altercation with Matt Kenseth the previous week. Jeff Gordon is most notably one of the victims who called out Keselowski for his spin as well as Matt Kenseth (collected in the crash), who expressed his displeasure against Keselowski by using Brad's "mind-boggling" comment from Richmond against Brad.

The outcry of the Talladega spin sort of resembled the controversial pace-lap accident before the start of the 1982 Indianapolis 500 given that in both situations a controversial driver (Kevin Cogan, or Keselowski) spun out for no apparent reason and wrecked several cars, causing an outcry of controversy & given the fact that both Cogan and Keselowski drove for Penske at the time.

Keselowski finished 2nd to Johnson at Dover. At Pocono, Keselowski took the lead from Justin Allgaier with less than 19 laps to go. On the final restart, a trash bag lodged in Keselowski's grille, causing overheating. With four laps to go, Keselowski tried to use the lap down car of Danica Patrick to blow the trash off his grille, which cost him the win as Dale Earnhardt Jr. took advantage of Keselowski slowing to pass him for the win.

A week later at Michigan, Keselowski finished 3rd, which marked his 3rd consecutive Top-3 finish. Keselowski himself is a Michigan native and said that winning the Michigan race would mean more to him than just winning the Daytona 500. At Sonoma, Keselowski got wrecked on lap 11 by Kyle Busch after Keselowski threw a failed block on Busch. After the wreck, he struggled to a 23rd-place finish.

At Kentucky, Keselowski raced in all 3 series (CWTS, NNS, and NSCS) and nearly won both the truck race and the Nationwide race, but came up just short. Keselowski however dominated the Sprint Cup race and got his second win of the season. Keselowski said his team was in "Championship Form". Keselowski made the headlines when his hand got severely injured by a champagne bottle during the victory lane celebration. Keselowski was rushed to the hospital and released after getting stitches.

At Daytona, Keselowski got caught up in both Big Ones but finished 18th, one lap down, by the time the race was called for rain.

Keselowski had a perfect weekend in New Hampshire when he won both Cup series practices, the pole for the Nationwide race, and leading one-hundred and fifty-five laps to win the Nationwide race. In the Cup race, Keselowski started 7th and moved to the lead early in the race to win his second Cup race in three weeks, his third of the year, and sweep the weekend.

At Iowa in the Nationwide Series, Keselowski qualified on the front row beside Ford Racing teammate, Trevor Bayne. Keselowski passed Michael McDowell with 2 laps to go to win the race. This was Keselowski's 3rd Nationwide Series victory of the season.

At Bristol in August, Keselowski won his first Camping World Truck Series race and became the twenty-fifth driver to record wins in all three of NASCAR's major series. He joined Aric Almirola as one of two drivers to record the feat in 2014. Keselowski had never won a Truck race in his previous 63 starts. The win also marked Ford's first truck win in the 2014 season.
In the Sprint Cup race, Keselowski finished second to teammate Joey Logano after leading many laps. Keselowski would later win the Federated Auto Parts 400 at Richmond, the 400th win for Penske.

At the Charlotte race in October, while under caution with six laps remaining, controversy struck Keselowski when, during caution laps, Matt Kenseth slammed into Keselowski's right front in response to a previous restart where Keselowski and Kenseth made unintentional contact. After the race, Denny Hamlin brake-checked Keselowski, due to being upset that Keselowski raced him hard. While driving onto pit road, Keselowski hit Kenseth in the door as retaliation to the incident that happened with 6 to go. When Keselowski began walking to his hauler, Kenseth physically attacked him from behind, and he had to be restrained by Keselowski's crew chief Paul Wolfe. During a later interview, Keselowski stated on lap 333, Kenseth had "swung at [his] car and tore the whole right-front off of it." Keselowski voluntarily went to the Oval Office but was fined $50,000 and placed on probation along with Tony Stewart who was fined $25,000. NASCAR stated in the penalty announcement that the main reason Keselowski was fined was that he made contact with Kenseth after the race had already ended. Despite this incident, Keselowski won at Talladega the following week, which allowed him to advance to the Eliminator Round of the Chase.

During the AAA Texas 500, Keselowski once again was the center of controversy.  On a green-white-checkered restart, Jeff Gordon entered the turn going to the high lane, leaving the middle lane open. Keselowski decided to go for it and try the same three-wide move on Gordon and Jimmie Johnson that he had done to win at Chicagoland, and Keselowski made contact with Gordon's rear quarter panel that cut down Gordon's left-rear tire, sending Gordon into a spin that relegated him to falling one lap down and finishing in 29th place, while Keselowski finished third. Following the race, Gordon approached Keselowski on pit road over the incident while both drivers were being surrounded by their pit crews.  However, it escalated into a brawl due to Keselowski being shoved from behind by Kevin Harvick, who had wanted Keselowski to fight Gordon.  The brawl ended up involving the crew chiefs of both teams as well as other members from Kasey Kahne, Danica Patrick, and Paul Menard's teams.  Both Gordon and Keselowski sustained facial injuries. He finished 4th in the 2014 Quicken Loans Race for Heroes 500, but it wasn't enough for him to advance to the final round. He was the highest-ranking driver outside of the final four at the end of the season. He also had set a personal best record of six victories throughout the season, which was the highest number of wins for anyone in the 2014 season.

2015

On January 25, 2015, Jeff Gluck of USA Today stated Keselowski was hired, along with Jeff Gordon and Kevin Harvick, as an Xfinity Series analyst for NASCAR on Fox. Keselowski would be in the booth for the Atlanta, Phoenix, and Richmond races.

Keselowski's season got off to a rocky start. During the Sprint Unlimited after starting 4th, running in the top ten for the first few laps and leading a few laps, Keselowski wrecked after slight contact from fellow driver Kyle Larson. He finished dead last in 25th place. Days later, Keselowski led the waning stages of the Daytona 300 in the Xfinity Series event. While leading on the final lap, Keselowski's momentum slowed down which allowed Ryan Reed to pass him for the lead and win the event. Keselowski finished 5th. The race was overshadowed by Kyle Busch's horrific crash with 8 laps to go.

Keselowski led early at Phoenix, leading 52 laps but lost a critical amount of track position after his team made the mistake of not pitting before a caution with less than 142 laps to go. Restarting 29th after the caution, Keselowski raced his way back to the top ten, finishing 6th.

The next week at Fontana was a victorious weekend for Keselowski. After a late-race restart, Keselowski impressively passed Kurt Busch on the final lap to win the race.

Keselowski finished second the next week at Martinsville being beaten by rival Denny Hamlin by 0.3 seconds. He had the faster car in the ending laps but he was unable to win the race because after restarting 4th, he was unable to get by Matt Kenseth or Joey Logano, quick enough as Hamlin, to challenge Hamlin for the win.

Keselowski had a dismal summer but still made the Chase for the Cup. Keselowski led 52 laps at Martinsville but got taken out of the race from contact with Matt Kenseth on a restart with 49 laps left. His crash set up the controversial wreck with Kenseth and teammate Joey Logano.

At Texas, Keselowski started on the pole and led the most laps (312 of 334). However, he got over-taken by Jimmie Johnson after a caution period with less than 10 laps to go. Keselowski finished second. Keselowski was eliminated from the final 4 spots of the Chase after finishing badly at Phoenix. Keselowski led the most laps of the Ford 400, but a late-race caution cost him the race, finishing 3rd behind Kyle Busch who won the race and the 2015 Cup series championship.

Keselowski's season was more disappointing than his 2014 campaign. He finished out the season with 1 win, 9 top-fives (5 of which were runners-up) 25 top tens, 3 poles, and 1 DNF.

2016

Keselowski started his season on a high note, leading the most laps of the Sprint Unlimited at Daytona. A late-race caution kept him from winning the race. Keselowski recovered from a bad pit stop to finish 9th. Keselowski didn't have any promising races at Daytona and Atlanta. However, he got his first Cup win of the season at Las Vegas, passing Kyle Busch with 6 laps to go.
Keselowski also won the 10th race of the season, the GEICO 500 at Talladega. He started 7th and led the most laps, 46 laps. He used the outside line to take the lead on lap 73, and swapped the lead with NASCAR driver Denny Hamlin multiple times, before blocking the three-wide lines. When NASCAR came back to Daytona, Brad would have the best car all night and led the most laps to win the Coke Zero 400 and get his third win of the season. Following that, at Kentucky, he would get his 4th win of the season, and second consecutive win, after a lengthy last 70 laps trying to conserve fuel. Keselowski made it through the first round of the Chase, but in the second round, he was eliminated. At Charlotte he would finish 7th, the next week at Kansas he was running in the top 10 but with 77 laps to go, Keselowski got loose and spun through the infield, tearing up his splitter and going to the garage and finishing 38th. Coming to Talladega, Keselowski was in a must-win situation, he started 2nd and had the dominant car leading 90 laps but with less than 50 laps remaining, he got a piece of debris on the grille and blew his engine going to the garage and finishing 38th for the 2nd week in a row. His teammate Joey Logano would go on to win the race. He would be eliminated from the 2nd round.

2017: First Championship 4 Appearance

Keselowski crashed out of the 2017 Daytona 500 after leading 13 laps during the race. At Atlanta, Keselowski suffered from various pit issues, including being forced to pit for a flat tire and loose lug nuts, as the race was dominated by the Ford of Kevin Harvick. On the final restart with eleven laps to go, Harvick was issued a speeding penalty and sent to the rear and enabling Keselowski to start on the front row alongside Kyle Larson. After battling with Larson, Keselowski successfully passed him to record the win.

After the Camping World 500 at Phoenix International Raceway, NASCAR announced that Keselowski's car had failed post-race laser inspection. Two days later, NASCAR penalized Keselowski with a $65,000 fine, a 35-point deduction, and a 3-race suspension for crew chief Paul Wolfe. In the 2017 Auto Club 400, Keselowski spun early but rebounded to finish second. After having Paul Wolfe serve one of the 3-race suspensions, Team Penske announced plans to appeal the penalty and was granted a deferral of the remainder of the penalty, including the points and fine.

Keselowski's second victory of the season came at Martinsville after passing Kyle Busch on lap 458. This was Keselowski's first win at the track, as well as the first there for Ford in 15 years.

After Martinsville, Team Penske's appeal was heard. After a 3-hour hearing, the appeal was denied by the National Motorsports Appeals Panel. Team Penske requested a final hearing with National Motorsports Final Appeals Officer, Bryan Moss. Moss wasn't able to preside over the hearing due to illness, so NASCAR had a former USAC president, Roger Werner preside over the hearing. The appeal was denied on May 9 leaving Wolfe suspended from the sport.

It has been confirmed that Keselowski will return to Team Penske for the 2018 season.

2018: Crown Jewel Victories

The 2018 season started slow for Keselowski, as he failed to win at the first 24 races. He then won back-to-back races at Darlington and Indianapolis, giving Team Penske its first victory in the Brickyard 400, which was a highly coveted win for Team Penske given their history at the Indianapolis Motor Speedway and the Indy 500. Keselowski backed up his Playoff run with a win at Las Vegas, giving Roger Penske his 500th overall motorsports victory as a car owner and advancing him to the Round of 12, despite surviving a hard crash at the Charlotte Roval. Keselowski was eliminated from the Round of 12 after the fall Kansas race and finished the season eighth in the points standings.

2019

Keselowski started the 2019 season with a 12th-place finish at the Daytona 500. A week later, he won at Atlanta; this gave him his 60th overall win with Team Penske and the first MENCS win for the new Ford Mustang GT. Keselowski followed this up with wins at Martinsville and Kansas.  Keselowski dominated the early stages of the Coke 600 but spun out with 5 to go, finishing 19th. He finished fifth at the Charlotte Roval to advance to the Round of 12. For the second season in a row, Keselowski was eliminated in the Round of 12 after the Kansas race.

2020: 2nd Championship 4 Appearance
Prior to the 2020 season, Blaney's crew chief Jeremy Bullins took over as Keselowski's, ending a nine-year partnership with Wolfe that saw them win the 2012 championship and 29 races.

Keselowski started the year by finishing 36th after getting wrecked while leading the Daytona 500. He rebounded next week at Las Vegas, finishing 7th. At Auto Club, he got his first top-5 finish of the season by finishing 5th. Keselowski got his first win of the season in the Coca-Cola 600 when he held off Jimmie Johnson in overtime for his maiden 600 victory. The next week at Bristol, while he was running third, leaders Chase Elliott and Logano wrecked, allowing for Keselowski to get his second win of the season. During the summer, although he had fewer wins than other drivers like Kevin Harvick and Denny Hamlin, he ran second in the standings in what he called "silently one of the best seasons of my career."

A third victory came in August at New Hampshire. He signed a contract extension with Team Penske the following day.

In the opening round of the playoffs, Keselowski won at Richmond after leading 192 of 400 laps, including the final 48 after passing Austin Dillon on fresher tires; the victory also came in his New Hampshire car. He relied on points to reach the final round at Phoenix, where he finished second in the championship to Elliott.

2021: Final Season At Penske

Keselowski began the 2021 season by being a late contender for the win in the Daytona 500. On the final lap, while receiving drafting help from eventual winner Michael McDowell, Keselowski tried to pass Logano in turn three but Logano's block and McDowell's push turned him into Logano. Keselowski went into the wall and was hit by Kyle Busch, causing his car to hit the catchfence and burst into flames; he walked away uninjured and ended up 13th. Keselowski would win the GEICO 500 after successfully passing Matt DiBenedetto on the final lap. During the playoffs, he made it to the Round of 8 before being eliminated after Martinsville. He finished the season 6th in the points standings.

On July 15, 2021, Penske announced Austin Cindric would take over the No. 2 beginning in 2022. The news aligned with Keselowski's own announcement five days later that he would join Roush Fenway Racing as a minority team owner and driver of the No. 6, replacing Ryan Newman. On November 16, Roush Fenway Racing officially rebranded itself into RFK Racing.

2022–present: RFK Racing

2022

Keselowski began the 2022 season as driver/co-owner of RFK Racing with a ninth-place finish at the 2022 Daytona 500. He then failed to score a top-10 finish at the next 14 races. On March 24, 2022, crew chief Matt McCall was suspended for four races and fined 100,000 for an L2 Penalty during post-race inspection after the 2022 Folds of Honor QuikTrip 500 at Atlanta. The penalty came under Sections 14.1 and 14.5 in the NASCAR Rule Book, both of which pertain to the modification of a single source supplied part. In addition, the No. 6 team was docked 100 driver and owner points and 10 playoff points. Team engineer Josh Sell was announced as Keselowski's crew chief for the 2022 Texas Grand Prix. On April 13, Scott Miller, NASCAR's senior vice president of competition, explained that the repairs No. 6's rear fascia did not meet original specifications, as a critical dimension of the part was altered. At Sonoma, Keselowski scored his first top-10 finish of the season since Daytona. At New Hampshire, Keselowski and Austin Dillon engaged in an on-road altercation during a caution lap. Due to his mediocre finishes and the lack of a win during the regular season, as well as the penalty imposed on the team, Keselowski missed the playoffs for the first time since 2013. Keselowski led 109 laps at the Bristol night race, but a flat tire while leading ended his chances of victory. Chris Buescher won to give Keselowski his first victory as a car owner in the Cup Series. Keselowski finished fourth at Martinsville, but was disqualified when his car did not meet the minimum weight requirements during post-race inspection. He went winless in points-paying races for the first time since 2010 and finished 24th in the final standings.

Brad Keselowski Racing

Keselowski formed his race team in 2007. The team began competing in the Truck Series in 2008. Keselowski drove the No. 29 Chevrolet himself and earned the team's first Top 10 finish.

In 2011 and part of 2012, Parker Kligerman drove the No. 29 Ram in the Camping World Truck Series for BKR. Kligerman finished 11th in points in 2011, but was released from BKR midway through the 2012 season, being replaced by Ryan Blaney. Blaney drove the team to its first victory on September 15, 2012, at Iowa Speedway.

In 2013, Keselowski was honored with the National Polish-American Sports Hall of Fame Excellence in Sports Award, in Troy, Michigan.

On August 17, 2017, Keselowski announced that BKR would close at the end of the 2017 season, though he remained hopeful to reopen the team in the future and turn it into a Cup Series team.

Keselowski Advanced Manufacturing
Established in early 2018 by Keselowski, Keselowski Advanced Manufacturing (KAM) was founded on the premise of celebrating American manufacturing, with an emphasis on additive manufacturing (also known as metal 3D printing).  Specialties also include CNC machining, quality control through scanning capabilities, and engineering design.  KAM's vertically integrated company model is aimed at providing end-to-end capabilities for customers from engineering to prototype, to post-processing to delivery.  The company held its official launch on January 24, 2019.

Personal life
On February 4, 2015, Keselowski announced that he and his girlfriend, Paige White, were expecting their first child, a girl. The baby, Scarlett, was born in 2015.  On December 11, 2016, Keselowski announced his engagement with White. In 2019, they had another baby girl, Autumn.

In popular media
Keselowski is featured as himself alongside Penske teammate Joey Logano in the movie Sharknado 3: Oh Hell No!.

Keselowski guest-starred in various episodes of the cancelled sitcom Sullivan & Son.

Keselowski had a cameo as a security guard in the 2017 film Logan Lucky.

Motorsports career results

NASCAR
(key) (Bold – Pole position awarded by time. Italics – Pole position earned by points standings. * – Most laps led.)

Cup Series

Daytona 500

Xfinity Series

Camping World Truck Series

 Season still in progress
 Ineligible for series points

ARCA Re/Max Series
(key) (Bold – Pole position awarded by qualifying time. Italics – Pole position earned by points standings or practice time. * – Most laps led.)

See also
List of all-time NASCAR Cup Series winners
List of Michigan sports figures
List of NASCAR Nationwide Series champions
List of Monster Energy NASCAR All-Star Race drivers
List of NASCAR Sprint Cup Series champions

References

External links

 
 
 

 

 

Living people
1984 births
People from Rochester Hills, Michigan
Racing drivers from Detroit
Racing drivers from Michigan
NASCAR Cup Series champions
NASCAR drivers
NASCAR Xfinity Series champions
NASCAR team owners
American people of Polish descent
Keselowski family
ARCA Menards Series drivers
JR Motorsports drivers
Hendrick Motorsports drivers
Team Penske drivers
RFK Racing drivers